Ioanna Tsatsou (January 1, 1909September 30, 2000) was a Greek writer from Smyrna. She is recognized as Righteous Among the Nations for her work to save Greek Jews during the Holocaust.

Early life
Tsatsou was born Ioanna Seferiádou in Smyrna, which is now İzmir, to Despina Seferiádou and Stelios Seferiadis. She had two brothers, Giorgos Seferis and Angelos Seferiadis. Seferiádou spoke both Greek and French from a young age. She and her family were in Athens during the Burning of Smyrna. They never returned to Smyrna. She wrote, "National despair was annihilating us. We had surrendered Greek soil, become fugitives. Greece shrank, shrank, crumpled." Seferiádou stayed in Athens for the rest of her life. Between 1927 and 1937, Seferiádou completed her studies in law and gained a PhD.

During WWII
The Axis Powers occupied Greece in 1941 during WWII. So began the Holocaust in Greece and the attempt to exterminate all Greek Jews, including the ancient Romaniote community and the Greek Sephardim. 

Ioanna Tsatsou, who lived in Athens, worked together with Archbishop Damaskinos to protect Jews in her community from the genocide. She assisted Damaskinos in secretly baptizing Greek Jews so they could obtain identity cards which said they were Christians. The aim of the baptism was not to convert the Jews. The purpose was only to secure false Christian identity cards for them so they would avoid death. 

Tsatsou ran a program, created by Archbishop Damaskinos, which provided monetary assistance to the families of Greek men who had been executed or taken hostage while resisting occupation.

On her own, Tsatsou ran a soup kitchen in Plaka which fed over 200 people each day. Many of the people they served were unemployed Jews. Her soup kitchen enabled many to survive the war. She also hid Yolanda Baruh and her parents in her home for months during the occupation.

In 1943, Tsatsou was interrogated by Italian forces who believed that Damaskinos was receiving money from the Middle East. She was unharmed.

Tsatsou wrote a book about her experience during the war, titled The Sword’s Fierce Edge: A Journal of the Occupation of Greece, 1941-1944.

Writing
Tsatsou wrote a number of books in Greek. Many have been translated into English. Her early works focused on the Axis occupation of Greece.

Personal life

Tsatsou was married to Konstantinos Tsatsos, a president of Greece. Her daughters were Theodora "Dora" Tsatsos-Simeonidi, a dancer, and Despina Mylonas. Konstantinos died in 1987 and Dora in June of 2000. She kept up correspondence with her brother Giorgos for most of her life.

Tsatsou died in 2000 at age 91.

Works
The Executed of the Occupation, 1947
The Sword’s Fierce Edge: A Journal of the Occupation of Greece, 1941-1944, 1965
Leaves of the Occupation, 1967
My Brother George Seferis, 1973
Debt, 1979
Hours of Sinai, 1981
Pierre Emmanuel and Greece, 1989

References

Smyrniote Greeks
1909 births
2000 deaths
20th-century Greek women writers
Greek women novelists
Greek women poets
Writers from Athens
Greek Righteous Among the Nations